Los Black Stars was a band from Medellin, Colombia. Their biggest hits were "La Piragua" and "Violencia" both by composer José Barros. These songs are featured on the compilation Las Cien Canciones Mas Bellas De Colombia.

Colombian cumbia musical groups